The 1990 UST Glowing Goldies men's basketball team represented University of Santo Tomas in the 53rd season of the University Athletic Association of the Philippines. The men's basketball tournament for the school year 1990–91 began on July 28, 1990, and the host school for the season was the University of the East.

The Goldies who had undergone a rebuilding phase in the summer won eight games against six losses for a tie with the FEU Tamaraws at fourth place in the standings at the end of the double round-robin eliminations. They led the league with an immaculate 8–0 record before crashing out with a six-game losing streak at the end of the season.

Roster

Depth chart

Roster changes 
The Goldies welcomed Aric del Rosario back into the team as their head coach after going through three coaching changes in the past two years.

Eight players that include seniors Ricarte Salvador, Digs Latoreno and team captain Alfrancis Chua have departed the team and are replaced by Binky Favis, who had transferred from La Salle, returning players Jimmy Sichon and Udoy Belmonte, and three towering rookies led by the 7-foot tall former UST Nuggets team captain EJ Feihl.

Subtractions

Additions

Injuries 
Rookie center EJ Feihl was running third in the statistical points tally behind teammate Billy Reyes and La Salle's Jun Limpot before falling ill from a heart condition. He did not suit up in their second-round game against the NU Bulldogs as he had to be transferred to the Philippine Heart Center from the UST Hospital. He returned on September 16 in their game against FEU after being confined for three weeks.

Schedule and results

UAAP games 

Elimination games were played in a double round-robin format. All games were aired on IBC 13 by Vintage Sports.

Postseason tournament 

Notes

References 

UST Growling Tigers basketball team seasons